Beitar Avraham Be'er Sheva was an Israeli football club based in Beersheba.

History
The club was founded in 1956 and started in Liga Gimel. After three seasons at the bottom tier, the club won their regional division and were promoted to Liga Bet. In the 1965–66 season, they won Liga Bet South B division and were promoted to Liga Alef, then the second tier of Israeli football. The club were relegated back to Liga Bet in 1969–70 after finishing second from bottom of the South Division. Beitar were promoted back to Liga Alef, now the third tier, at the end of the 1978–79 season, remaining in Liga Alef until the 1986–87 season, when they were relegated back to Liga Bet.

In 1991 the club had returned to Liga Alef, and were promoted to Liga Artzit (then the second tier) in 1998. In their first season at the second level they finished fourth. In the 2000–01 season the club finished third, missing out on promotion to the Israeli Premier League by a single point (they had a better goal difference than runners-up Maccabi Kiryat Gat). Although they finished fourth the following season, Beitar finished bottom of Liga Leumit (which had become the second division in 1999) in 2002–03, without winning an away match all season, and were due to be relegated to Liga Artzit. However, the club folded in the summer, with Hapoel Marmorek promoted from Liga Alef to take their place.

The club's stadium was named after Michael Reisser, a Likud MK who died following a car accident in 1988.

S.C. Be'er Sheva

In 2006, a successor club, F.C. Be'er Sheva, Moadon Sport Be'er Sheva, lit. Be'er Sheva Sport Club (or in short  Mem Samekh Be'er Sheva, lit. F.C. Be'er Sheva) was founded, after the Israel Football Association allowed it only three years after the original club folded because of financial collapse.

In their first season, F.C. Be'er Sheva finished runners-up in Liga Gimel Central-South division and were promoted to Liga Bet, where they play since in the South B division.

Honours

League

External links
 Moadon Sport Be'er Sheva The Israel Football Association

References

Be'er Sheva
Sport in Beersheba
Be'er Sheva
Association football clubs established in 1956
Association football clubs disestablished in 2003
Association football clubs established in 2006
1956 establishments in Israel
2003 disestablishments in Israel
2006 establishments in Israel
Organizations based in Beersheba